Remo is an American drum skin company.

Remo may also refer to:

Languages
 Remo language (disambiguation), several languages of Peru
 Bonda language or Remo, a language in India

People with the surname 
 Chris Remo, American video game designer
 Jeanette Solstad Remø, Norwegian activist

People with the given name
 Remo D'Souza (born 1974) Indian dancer, choreographer, actor and film director
 Remo Fernandes (born 1953), Indian singer
 Remo Holsmer (born 1980), Estonian politician

Fictional 
 Remo Williams, the main character in The Destroyer novel series by Warren Murphy and Richard Sapir
 Remo Gaggi, a character in the 1995 film Casino

Other uses 
 Remo (film), a 2016 Indian film
 Remo (grape) or Riesling, a German wine grape variety
 Remo North, a Local Government Area in Ogun State, Nigeria
 Bonda people or Remo, a tribe of people in southwestern Orissa, India
 Clube do Remo, a Brazilian football club
 Remo Stars F.C., a football club in Nigeria
Remo Williams: The Adventure Begins, 1986 American film

See also
 San Remo (disambiguation)
 Remo Drive, an American rock band
 Remus (disambiguation)
 
 Remo